Padayappa also known as Munnar Padayappa is a wild elephant in Munnar in the Indian state of Kerala, known for its frequent appearances in residential areas. Padayappa, who occasionally roams on populated areas and creates traffic blocks on highways, does not harass or become aggressive. The elephant's frequent visit to populated areas and cities as opposed to usual wild elephants and its calm nature caused it to attract wider media attention. Padayappa can be easily spotted because of his limp due to an injury on his hind leg and his unusually long tusks. It is named after the character in the 1999 Tamil movie Padayappa. The elephant is identified by its name Padayappa even in the forest department circles. Padayappa came to the media's notice in 2015, when the elephant discovered a sackful of carrots that the shopekeepers had hidden from it by the riverside. Only after eating all the carrots did it head into the forests without attacking anyone. On 5 April 2022, Padayappa jumped in front of a KSRTC bus coming to Munnar. The driver stopped the bus and the elephant checked the bus with trunk. Meanwhile, a scratch fell on the glass of the bus. The driver sped off the vehicle when Padayappa could moved back a little.

See also
 List of individual elephants

References 

Elephants in Kerala